Homelessness in the United Kingdom is measured and responded to in differing ways in England, Scotland, Wales and Northern Ireland but affects people living in every part of the UK's constituent countries.

Homeless population

The UK homeless charity Shelter estimated in 2019 that the number of people in the England who were entirely homeless or in temporary accommodation was 280,000. Rough sleepers are only a small proportion of the homeless. Crisis estimates there are roughly 12,300 rough sleepers in the UK and also 12,000 people sleeping in sheds, bins, cars, tents and night busses. The figure is derived from research by Heriot-Watt University.  People experiencing homelessness sleeping in bins are sometimes crushed to death by compacting machinery or otherwise killed when bins are collected and dealt with by waste disposal companies.

According to figures from the Department of Communities and Local Government, the number of people registered as homeless with local councils was just over 100,000 in 1998, rose to 135,000 in 2003 before declining in the years up to and during the Great Recession. After a low of 40,000 in 2009 and 2010, the figure rose to just under 60,000 in 2017. The number living in temporary accommodation rose from 50,000 in 1998 to 100,000 in 2005, declining back to 50,000 in 2011, then rising to 80,000 in 2017.

The number of rough sleepers was 4,800 in 2017 compared to 1,800 in 2010, when comparable records begin. Crisis attributes rising homelessness to a shortage of social housing, housing benefits not covering private rents and a shortage of homeless prevention schemes for people leaving care.

Of the people experiencing homelessness who died in 2017, the average age was 44 for men and 42 for women. Suicide, substance and excessive alcohol use are the most common causes of death among people experiencing homelessness in the UK.

History

Historically, support for people who became homeless was provided by monastic communities. After the Reformation, forms of support through early local government structures were provided by means of the poor law, which differed in England and Wales, Scotland, and Ireland.

Eventually, a system of formally elected local authorities replaced the poor law unions. The current system of local authority housing and homelessness assistance in England, was introduced by the Housing (Homeless Persons) Act 1977 and is currently overseen through the Housing Act 1996.

Prevention

To prevent homelessness the charity Crisis maintains the public sector should:
Build 100,500 social homes a year to address the needs of people experiencing homelessness and those on low income.  
Introduce Housing First nationally providing homes and specialised support for people experiencing homelessness.
Improve rights for private renters and improve housing benefit.
The care system, hospitals, prisons should be legally required to help find homes for those leaving their care.
There should be homelessness specialists at Job Centres.

Causes of homelessness

The longer term causes of homelessness have been examined by a number of research studies. A number of different pathways into homelessness have been identified; research suggests that both personal factors (e.g. addictions) and structural factors (e.g. poverty) are ultimately responsible for the sequence of events that results in homelessness. For young people, there are additional factors that appear to be involved, most notably needing to face the responsibilities of independent living before they are ready for them. Rising costs of housing and increases in job insecurity have also been identified as contributing factors.

Government assistance

Policy on homelessness is overseen by the Ministry of Housing, Communities and Local Government and Homes and Communities Agency in England, the Scottish Government Housing and Social Justice Directorate, the Welsh Government, and the Department for Communities and Northern Ireland Housing Executive
in Northern Ireland. It has been a devolved policy area outside England since the introduction of devolution in the 1990s. The Grenfell Tower fire in June 2017 focused national attention on homelessness and housing quality, and resulted in around 255 people becoming homeless overnight. It was reported in The Guardian in 2018 that half of young people at risk of homelessness in the UK who approached their local authority, received no significant help.

All Local Housing Authorities (LHAs) in the United Kingdom have a legal statutory duty to provide 24-hour advice to homeless people, or those who are at risk of becoming homeless within 28 days. Once an individual applies to the appropriate City Council, Borough Council, District Council or Unitary Authority for assistance, from a person claiming to be homeless (or threatened with homelessness), the Local Housing Authority is also legally duty bound to make detailed inquiries into that person's circumstances, in order to decide whether they meet the criteria, which are defined as statutory homelessness. For people meeting such criteria, the Local Housing Authority therefore has a legal statutory duty to find Temporary Accommodation for the person, and then provide them with assistance to find a permanent, long term adequate dwelling, that will usually be within the Private Rented Sector (PRS), but sometimes will be a property with a Housing Association, a council house, or a council flat.

Statutory homelessness

Definition
A person suffers statutory homelessness if governmental regulations oblige the council to provide housing-related support to the person. At present this criterion is met if (and only if) all of the following conditions are true:
they do not have a permanent home
the person is not prevented from accessing UK public funds by immigration laws
the person has a local connection to the local authority's area (this could, for example, be the residential presence of family, friends, or previous residence of the person themselves)
the person unintentionally become homeless (this does not include eviction for non-payment of rent)
the person is in priority need; this condition has been abolished in Scotland since the start of 2013, and there are campaigns for it to be abolished in the rest of the UK.

The definition of priority need varies between England, Scotland, Wales, and Northern Ireland, but generally includes any of following conditions being met:
pregnancy
a dependant child
an age of 16–17
aged 18–20 and leaving local authority care
vulnerability due to
old age, or
mental illness, or 
mental/physical disability
leaving the armed forces
leaving prison
fleeing, or at the risk of, domestic violence
homelessness due to an emergency (such as flood, fire, or other disaster)

A person does not have to be roofless to legally qualify as lacking a permanent home. They may be in possession of accommodation which it is not reasonably feasible to continue to use by virtue of its affordability, condition, or location. The requirement to have a local connection does not apply if it would lead to the applicant becoming a victim of violence, or at risk of violence.

In Wales, priority need was similarly extended to include individuals who are aged 18 to 20 and at risk of financial or sexual exploitation, but provided they are leaving care.

Consequences

Temporary accommodation must be provided to those that might be suffering statutory homelessness, pending a final decision. Often bed and breakfast hotels are used for temporary accommodation, unless a suitable hostel or refuge is available. The suitability of temporary accommodation is often a topic of concern for local media, and pressure groups.

If the council concludes that the applicant suffers statutory homelessness then the local authority has a legal duty to find long-term accommodation for the applicant and their household (those dependants who would ordinarily be living with them), and any other person whom it is reasonable to expect to reside with them. The council must offer/continue to provide temporary accommodation to such an applicant, on an immediate basis, until long-term accommodation is found for them.

Long-term accommodation may not necessarily be a socially rented home (one provided by the council, or by a Housing Association); the council can discharge its duty by finding an appropriate private sector tenancy for the applicant.

Non-statutory homelessness

If the authority decides that a person does lack a home, but does not qualify as suffering statutory homelessness, then a lesser obligation applies.

Where the applicant merely lacks a local connection to the council, the council will usually refer the applicant's case to a local authority with which they do have a local connection. If the applicant is in priority need, but is considered to have become homeless intentionally, the local authority is obliged to provide temporary accommodation for as long as is reasonably necessary for the applicant to find long-term accommodation; this is usually a fortnight, but additional periods of similar length can sometimes be provided at the council's discretion (typically granted in cases of extenuating circumstances).

Rough sleeping
A national service, called Streetlink, was established in 2012 to help members of the public obtain near-immediate assistance for specific rough sleepers, with the support of the Government (as housing is a devolved matter, the service currently only extends to England). Currently, the service doesn't operate on a statutory basis, and the involvement of local authorities is merely due to political pressure from the government and charities, with funding being provided by the government (and others) on an ad-hoc basis.  The UK government has cut funding to local authorities and local authorities feel forced to reduce services for people experiencing homelessness. It is feared this will increase the numbers of rough sleepers and increase the numbers dying while sleeping rough.

A member of the public who is concerned that someone is sleeping on the streets can report the individual's details via the Street Link website or by calling its hotline. Someone who finds themselves sleeping on the streets can also report their situation using the same methods.

The service aims to respond within 24 hours, including an assessment of the individual circumstances and an offer of temporary accommodation for the following nights. The response typically includes a visit to the rough sleeper early in the morning that follows the day or night on which the report has been made. The service operates via a number of charities and with the assistance of local councils.

Where appropriate, rough sleepers will also be offered specialist support:
if they have substance misuse issues, they will be referred for support from organisations such as St. Mungo's (despite the name, this is a non-religious charity)
if they are foreign nationals with no right to access public funds in the UK, repatriation assistance will be offered, including finding accommodation in the home country, construction of support plans, and financial assistance.

It was reported in 2018 that at least 50 local authorities had enacted Public Space Protection Orders to deter begging in town centres. Liberty has argued that these ordinances are illegal and that people experiencing homelessness often lack the access to the legal aid support needed to challenge them.

Non-government assistance
Practical advice regarding homelessness can be obtained through a number of major non-governmental organisations including,
Citizens Advice Bureaus and some other charities also offer free legal advice in person, by telephone, or by email, from qualified lawyers and others operating on a pro bono basis
Shelter provides extensive advice about homelessness and other housing problems on their website, and from the telephone number given there, including about rights and legal situations.

Statistics
Official statistics on homelessness for:
England
Scotland
Wales
Northern Ireland (included in Northern Ireland Housing Statistics)

See also
The Connection at St Martin's
Deinstitutionalisation
Post-traumatic stress disorder
Housing in the United Kingdom
Affordability of housing in the United Kingdom
Poverty in the United Kingdom
Museum of Homelessness
Simon Community

Further reading 
BBC News, "Warning over homelessness figures: Government claims that homelessness numbers have fallen by a fifth since last year should be taken with a health warning, says housing charity Shelter", Monday, 13 June 2005
BBC Radio 4, "No Home, a season of television and radio programmes that introduce the new homeless.", 2006
"UK Housing Review"

References 

Homelessness in the United Kingdom